A high-pressure area, high, or anticyclone, is an area near the surface of a planet where the atmospheric pressure is greater than the pressure in the surrounding regions. Highs are  middle-scale meteorological features that result from interplays between the relatively  larger-scale dynamics of an entire planet's atmospheric circulation.

The strongest high-pressure areas result from masses of cold air which spread out from  polar regions into cool neighboring regions. These highs weaken once they extend out over warmer bodies of water.

Weaker—but more frequently occurring—are high-pressure areas caused by atmospheric subsidence: Air becomes cool enough to precipitate out its water vapor, and large masses of cooler, drier air descend from above. 

Within high-pressure areas, winds flow from where the pressure is highest, at the center of the area, toward the periphery where the pressure is lower. However, if the planet is rotating, the straight direction of the air flow from the center to the periphery is bent by the Coriolis effect. Viewed from above, the wind direction is bent in the direction opposite to the planet's rotation; this causes the characteristic spiral shape of the tropical cyclones otherwise known as hurricanes and typhoons.

On English-language weather maps, high-pressure centers are identified by the letter H. Weather maps in other languages may use different letters or symbols.

Wind circulation in the northern and southern hemispheres
The direction of wind flow around an atmospheric high-pressure area and a low-pressure area, as seen from above, depends on the hemisphere. High-pressure systems rotate clockwise in the northern Hemisphere; low-pressure systems rotate clockwise in the southern hemisphere.

High pressure systems may be either warm or cold types, the former originating in the subtropics and the latter at high latitudes, the time of year dictating which type is more dominant. Humidity and temperature of the high pressure system will depend on its source of origin. Warm high pressure systems from the horse latitudes (see below) create typical summer heat waves while cold high pressure systems bring freezing spells in winter and cooler, lower humidity in summer. If a high sits over the same area for several days it will take on the characteristics of that terrain. Cold high pressure systems in the Northern Hemisphere originate from Siberia, interior Canada, or the north Atlantic or Pacific, the latter two types trailing behind cyclonic systems. In the Southern Hemisphere, which is mostly water, these originate principally from the southern oceans.

The latitudes of 30N and 30S have semi-permanent high pressure around them known as the subtropical ridge, although their size and exact location varies with the seasons. On the West Coast of the United States, the subtropical ridge expands in spring and brings the region's characteristic rainless summer weather. As it shrinks in fall, the West Coast is subject to cold fronts from the Pacific which bring rain during the cool months. On the East Coast, it brings warm, humid air in late spring and throughout summer. In fall, as the subtropical ridge retreats, cold air from Canada takes over. In Europe, the effect is similar as the subtropical ridge brings the Mediterranean hot, dry summer weather and cool, wet winters. Europe north of the Pyrenees is at a higher latitude so the effect of the ridge is somewhat less significant and this region is mainly characterized by a cooler maritime climate. However, a particularly hot summer such as 2003 or 2019 which sees the subtropical ridge expand more than usual can bring heat waves as far north as Scandinavia--conversely, while Europe had record-breaking summer heat in 2003 due to a particularly strong subtropical ridge, its counterpart in North America was unusually weak and temperatures across the continent that spring and summer were wet and well below normal.

In the Southern Hemisphere the result is similar. Australia and the southern cone of South America get hot, dry summer weather from the subtropical ridge and cooler wetter winter weather as cold fronts from the southern oceans take over.

Winter sees the dominance of cold highs from the sub-Arctic. In Western Europe and the West Coast of North America, these originate in the Gulf of Alaska or the Greenland/Iceland area and move south to southeast. Since they are principally masses of ocean air, they will bring cool, damp conditions with widespread fog. In East Asia and interior North America, these air masses come from Siberia or Canada and bring very cold, dry air in their wake.

The scientific terms in English used to describe the weather systems generated by highs and lows were introduced in the mid-19th century, mostly by the British. The scientific theories which explain the general phenomena originated about two centuries earlier.

The term cyclone was coined by Henry Piddington of the British East India Company to describe the devastating storm of December 1789 in Coringa, India. A cyclone forms around a low-pressure area. Anticyclone, the term for the kind of weather around a high-pressure area, was coined in 1877 by Francis Galton to indicate an area whose winds revolved in the opposite direction of a cyclone. In British English, the opposite direction of clockwise is referred to as anticlockwise, making the label anticyclones a logical extension.

A simple rule is that for high-pressure areas, where generally air flows from the center outward, the coriolis force given by the earth's rotation to the air circulation is in the opposite direction of earth's apparent rotation if viewed from above the hemisphere's pole. So, both the earth and winds around a low-pressure area rotate counter-clockwise in the northern hemisphere, and clockwise in the southern. The opposite to these two cases occurs in the case of a high. These results derive from the Coriolis effect; that article explains in detail the physics, and provides an animation of a model to aid understanding.

Formation

High-pressure areas form due to downward motion through the troposphere, the atmospheric layer where weather occurs.  Preferred areas within a synoptic flow pattern in higher levels of the troposphere are beneath the western side of troughs.

On weather maps, these areas show converging winds (isotachs), also known as convergence, near or above the level of non-divergence, which is near the 500 hPa pressure surface about midway up through the troposphere, and about half the atmospheric pressure at the surface.

High-pressure systems are alternatively referred to as anticyclones. On English-language weather maps, high-pressure centers are identified by the letter H in English, within the isobar with the highest pressure value. On constant pressure upper level charts, it is located within the highest height line contour.

Typical conditions
 Highs are frequently associated with light winds at the surface and subsidence through the lower portion of the troposphere.  In general, subsidence will dry out an air mass by adiabatic, or compressional, heating.  Thus, high pressure typically brings clear skies.  During the day, since no clouds are present to reflect sunlight, there is more incoming shortwave solar radiation and temperatures rise. At night, the absence of clouds means that outgoing longwave radiation (i.e. heat energy from the surface) is not absorbed, giving cooler diurnal low temperatures in all seasons.  When surface winds become light, the subsidence produced directly under a high-pressure system can lead to a buildup of particulates in urban areas under the ridge, leading to widespread haze. If the low level relative humidity rises towards 100 percent overnight, fog can form.

Strong, vertically shallow high-pressure systems moving from higher latitudes to lower latitudes in the northern hemisphere are associated with continental arctic air masses.  Once arctic air moves over an unfrozen ocean, the air mass modifies greatly over the warmer water and takes on the character of a maritime air mass, which reduces the strength of the high-pressure system. When extremely cold air moves over relatively warm oceans, polar lows can develop.  However, warm and moist (or maritime tropical) air masses that move poleward from tropical sources are slower to modify than arctic air masses.

In climatology

The horse latitudes, or torrid zone, is roughly at the 30th parallel and is the source of warm high pressure systems. As the hot air closer to the equator rises, it cools, losing moisture; it is then transported poleward where it descends, creating the high-pressure area.  This is part of the Hadley cell circulation and is known as the subtropical ridge or subtropical high. It follows the track of the sun over the year, expanding north (south in the Southern Hemisphere) in spring and retreating south (north in the Southern Hemisphere) in fall.  The subtropical ridge is a warm core high-pressure system, meaning it strengthens with height.  Many of the world's deserts are caused by these climatological high-pressure systems.

Some climatological high-pressure areas acquire regionally based names. The land-based Siberian High often remains quasi-stationary for more than a month during the most frigid time of the year, making it unique in that regard.  It is also a bit larger and more persistent than its counterpart in North America.  Surface winds accelerating down valleys down the western Pacific Ocean coastline, causing the winter monsoon.  Arctic high-pressure systems such as the Siberian High are cold core, meaning that they weaken with height. The influence of the Azores High, also known as the Bermuda High, brings fair weather over much of the North Atlantic Ocean and mid to late summer heat waves in western Europe.  Along its southerly periphery, the clockwise circulation often impels easterly waves, and tropical cyclones that develop from them, across the ocean towards landmasses in the western portion of ocean basins during the hurricane season. The highest barometric pressure ever recorded on Earth was  measured in Tosontsengel, Zavkhan, Mongolia on 19 December 2001.

Connection to wind

Wind flows from areas of high pressure to areas of low pressure.  This is due to density differences between the two air masses.  Since stronger high-pressure systems contain cooler or drier air, the air mass is more dense and flows towards areas that are warm or moist, which are in the vicinity of low pressure areas in advance of their associated cold fronts.  The stronger the pressure difference, or pressure gradient, between a high-pressure system and a low-pressure system, the stronger the wind. The coriolis force caused by the Earth's rotation is what gives winds within high-pressure systems their clockwise circulation in the northern hemisphere (as the wind moves outward and is deflected right from the center of high pressure) and counterclockwise circulation in the southern hemisphere (as the wind moves outward and is deflected left from the center of high pressure).  Friction with land slows down the wind flowing out of high-pressure systems and causes wind to flow more outward than would be the case in the absence of friction. This results in the 'actual wind' or 'true wind', including ageostrophic corrections, which add to the geostrophic wind that is characterized by flow parallel to the isobars.

See also

References

Meteorological phenomena
Anticyclones